Adamiak is a surname originating from Poland. It is a Polish pet name for Adam. The name may refer to:

 Dirk Adamiak (born 1970), German record producer and musician
 Elżbieta Adamiak (born 1964), Polish Roman Catholic theologian. 
 Jan Adamiak (born 1948), Polish politician

See also

References 

Polish-language surnames